The 2015 Bord na Móna Walsh Cup was the 53rd staging of the Walsh Cup since its establishment in 1954.

Fixtures and results

Group 1

Kilkenny withdrew from the competition on 21 January 2015 following the death of Johnny Ryan. They hadn't yet played a game, leaving Carlow and NUIG to play off for a place in the semi-finals.

Group 2

Group 3

Group 4

Semi-finals

Final

References

External links
The Bord Na Mona Walsh Cup S.H. 2015
Leinster G.A.A. Results 2015

Walsh
Walsh Cup (hurling)